Haiti competed at the 2020 Summer Olympics in Tokyo. Originally scheduled to take place from 24 July to 9 August 2020, the Games were postponed to 23 July to 8 August 2021, because of the COVID-19 pandemic. It was the nation's seventeenth appearance at the Summer Olympics since its debut in 1900.

The early days of the Olympics was nearly overshadowed by the assassination of Jovenel Moïse, the country's last president two weeks earlier. Allowing Haitian athletes expressing grief.

Competitors
The following is a list of the number of competitors participating in the Games for Haiti:

Athletics

Haiti received a universality slot from the World Athletics to send a female track and field athlete to the Olympics. Vanessa Clerveaux withdrew from the team because of injury.

Track & road events

Boxing

Haiti received an invitation from the Tripartite Commission to send the men's middleweight boxer Darrelle Valsaint to the Olympics.

Judo

Haiti qualified one judoka for the women's half-lightweight category (52 kg) at the Games. Sabiana Anestor accepted a continental berth from the Americas as the nation's top-ranked judoka outside of direct qualifying position in the IJF World Ranking List of June 28, 2021.

Swimming

Haiti received a universality invitation from FINA to send two top-ranked swimmers (one per gender) in their respective individual events to the Olympics, based on the FINA Points System of June 28, 2021.

Taekwondo

Haiti entered one athlete into the taekwondo competition at the Games. Florida-born practitioner Aliyah Shipman secured a spot in the women's welterweight category (67 kg) with a top two finish at the 2020 Pan American Qualification Tournament in San José, Costa Rica. The United States Olympic & Paralympic Committee blocked her from participation on the grounds that athletes need three years to change the country they represent, and she fought for the United States one year before. Shipman tried to appeal, backed by the Haitian Taekwondo Federation, on the condition that junior athletes do not fall under the same waiting period, but it fell through, so her spot was awarded to another American, Lauren Lee.

See also
Haiti at the 2019 Pan American Games

References 

Olympics
Nations at the 2020 Summer Olympics
2020